Villingili (Dhivehi: ވިލިނގިލި) is one of the inhabited islands of Gaafu Alif Atoll.

History
In former times, Vilingili boat owners used to decorate their fishing boats with rich and varied decorative patterns. This practice was discontinued in the 1970s.

Archaeology
According to Mr. Ibrahim Lutfi there was a mound in an area of the island that has been eroded away by the currents on the reef. This mound was probably an ancient Buddhist stupa.

Geography
It is located on the northeastern rim of Huvadu Atoll. Traditionally this island is also known as 'Huvadu Atoll Vilingili'. Northern Huvadhu Atoll or Gaafu Alifu is an administrative division created on 8 February 1962, when Huvadhu Atoll was divided into two districts.

Demography

Services
The World Health Organization has a local unit there.

References

Divehiraajjege Jōgrafīge Vanavaru. Muhammadu Ibrahim Lutfee. G.Sōsanī. Malé 1999.

External links
 Healthy Villingili Island

Populated places in the Maldives
Islands of the Maldives